Maksim Dmitriyevich Savelyev (born 22 January 2002) is a Russian football player who plays for FC Chertanovo Moscow.

Club career
He made his debut in the Russian Football National League for FC Chertanovo Moscow on 8 August 2020 in a game against FC Tom Tomsk, he substituted Ilya Molteninov in the 64th minute.

References

External links
 
 Profile by Russian Football National League
 

2002 births
Living people
Russian footballers
Association football forwards
FC Chertanovo Moscow players